The following is a complete list of compositions by Austrian composer Alexander von Zemlinsky.

Works sorted by opus number

Works with opus number 

Op. 1, Ländliche Tänze (c. 1891)
Op. 2, Lieder für Singstimme und Klavier (1895-96)
Op. 3, Trio for clarinet (or violin), violoncello and piano in D minor (1896)
Op. 4, String Quartet No.1 in A major (1896)
Op. 5, Gesänge für Singstimme und Klavier (1896-97)
Op. 6, Walzer-Gesänge nach toskanischen Volksliedern (1898)
Op. 7, Irmelin Rose und andere Gesänge (c. 1898-99)
Op. 8, Turmwächterlied und andere Gesänge (1898-99)
Op. 9, Fantasien über Gedichte von Richard Dehmel (1898)
Op. 10, Ehetanzlied und andere Gesänge (1899-1901)
Op. 11, Der Traumgörge (1904-06)
Op. 12, Kleider machen Leute (1907-09)
Op. 13, Six Songs to texts by Maurice Maeterlinck (1910/13)
Op. 14, Psalm 23 (1910)
Op. 15, String Quartet No.2 (1913-15)
Op. 16, Eine florentinische Tragödie (1915-16)
Op. 17, Der Zwerg (1919-21)
Op. 18, Lyric Symphony (1922-23)
Op. 19, String Quartet No.3 (1924)
Op. 20, Symphonische Gesänge for baritone or alto and orchestra (1929)
Op. 21, Der Kreidekreis (1930-31)
Op. 22, Sechs Lieder für Singstimme und Klavier (1934)
Op. 23, Sinfonietta (1934)
Op. 24, Psalm 13 (1935)
Op. 25, String Quartet No. 4 (Suite) (1936)
Op. 26, Der König Kandaules (1935-36)
Op. 27, 12 Lieder für Singstimme und Klavier (1937)

Works without opus number 
Those works marked with an asterisk (*) are currently unavailable

 Seven Songs (1889-90)
 * Piano Sonata in C minor (1890)
 Drei Stücke für Violoncello und Klavier (1891)
 * Symphony in E minor (1891) — two surviving movements only
 * Drei leichte Stücke für Klavier (1891)
 * Terzet in A major for two violins and viola (1892)
 Symphony No. 1 in D minor (1892)
 4 Ballads for piano (1892–93)
 * Piano Quartet in D major (1893) — partially lost
 String Quartet in E minor (c.1893)
  Cello Sonata (1894)
 Two Movements for String Quintet (1894-96) — surviving movements of the String Quintet in D minor
 Lustspielouvertüre (1894-95)
 Sarema (1893-95)
 Orchestersuite (1895)
 Albumblatt (Erinnerung aus Wien) for piano (1895)
 Minnelied for male chorus and chamber ensemble (c.1895)
 Waldgespräch for soprano, two horns, harp and strings (1895)
 Five Songs (1895-96)
 Skizze for piano (1896)
 Hochzeitgesang for tenor solo, chorus and organ (1896)
 Frühlingsglaube for mixed chorus and string orchestra (1896)
 Geheimnis for mixed chorus and string orchestra (1896)
 Serenade (Suite) for violin and piano (1896)
 Symphony No. 2 in B-flat major (1897)
 Es war einmal (1897-99)
 Frühlingsbegräbnis for soprano, baritone, mixed chorus and orchestra (1896/97, rev. c.1903)
 Aurikelchen for female chorus (1898)
 Maiblumen blühten überall for soprano and string sextet (c. 1898)
 * Fridl, singspiel for solo voices and piano (c.1900) — partially lost
 Psalm 83 (1900)
 Erdeinsamkeit (1900-01)
 Der alte Garten (1900-01)
 Der Triumph der Zeit (1900-04)
Menuett (from Das gläserne Herz) for piano (1901)
Drei Ballettstücke (1902)
Ein Tanzpoem (1904)
 Two Brettl-Lieder (1901)
 Ein Lichtstrahl for piano (1901)
 Die Seejungfrau (The Little Mermaid), after Hans Christian Andersen (1902-03)
 Four Songs (1903-5)
 Arrangement of Mahler's Symphonie No. 6 for piano four-hands (1906)
 Two Ballads for baritone and piano (1907)
 Five Songs to texts by Richard Dehmel for voice and piano (1907)
 Malwa (1912) — unfinished; fragment realised and orchestrated by Antony Beaumont (2021)
 Incidental music for Shakespeare's Cymbeline (1913-15) — originally op. 14
 Four Songs for voice and piano (1916)
 Two Movements for string quartet (1927) — completed movements of abandoned quartet, originally intended as No.4
 Und einmal gehst du (1933)
 Das bucklichte Männlein (1934)
 Ahnung Beatricens (1935)
 Quartet for clarinet, violin, viola and cello (1938/39) — unfinished
 Three Songs (1939-40)
 Humoreske (Rondo) for wind quintet (1939)
 Hunting Piece (Jagdstück) for two horns and piano (1939)

Works sorted by type of composition

Operas

Other stage works
 Ein Lichtstrahl (A Ray of Light). Mime drama for piano (scenario by Oskar Geller, 1901, rev. 1902)
 Ein Tanzpoem. A Dance Poem in one act for orchestra (Hugo von Hofmannsthal (1901–04, final version of the ballet Der Triumph der Zeit)
 Incidental music for Shakespeare's Cymbeline for tenor, reciters and orchestra (1913–15)

Choral works
 Frühlingsglaube for mixed chorus and string orchestra (T: Ludwig Uhland) (1896)
 Geheimnis for mixed chorus and string orchestra (1896)
 Minnelied (T: Heinrich Heine) for men's choir and chamber ensemble (c.1895)
 Hochzeitsgesang (T: Jewish liturgy) for Cantor (Tenor), chorus, and organ (1896) Text:  Baruch Haba, Mi Adir
 Frühlingsbegräbnis (Text: Paul Heyse). Cantata for soprano, baritone, mixed chorus and orchestra (1896/97, rev. c.1903)
 Aurikelchen (T: Richard Dehmel) for women's choir (1898)
 Psalm 83 for mixed chorus and orchestra (1900)
 Psalm 23 for chorus and orchestra, Op. 14 (1910, first performance, Vienna 1910)
 Psalm 13 for chorus and orchestra, Op. 24 (1935)

Voice and orchestra
 Waldgespräch (T: Joseph von Eichendorff) for soprano, two horns, harp and strings (1896)
 Maiblumen blühten überall (T: Richard Dehmel) for soprano and string sextet (c.1898)
 Erdeinsamkeit (1900-01) (T: unknown) - orchestrated by Antony Beaumont (1999)
 Der alte Garten (1900-01) (T: Eichendorff) - orchestrated by Antony Beaumont (1999)
 Sechs Gesänge after poems by Maurice Maeterlinck, Op. 13 (1910/13, orchestrated 1913/21)
 Lyric Symphony for soprano, baritone and orchestra, Op. 18 (after poems by Rabindranath Tagore) (1922–23)
 Symphonische Gesänge for baritone or alto and orchestra, Op. 20 (T: from Afrika singt. Eine Auslese neuer afro-amerikanischer Lyrik, 1929)

Songs for voice and piano
 Seven Songs (1889-90)
 Five Songs (1895-96)
 Lieder, Op. 2 (2 volumes, 1895–96)
 Gesänge, Op. 5 (2 volumes, 1896–97)
 Walzer-Gesänge nach toskanischen Liedern von Ferdinand Gregorovius, Op. 6 (1898)
 Irmelin Rose und andere Gesänge, Op. 7 (1898/99)
 Turmwächterlied und andere Gesänge, Op. 8 (1898/99)
 Ehetanzlied und andere Gesänge, Op. 10 (1899–1901)
 Two Brettl-Lieder (1901)
 Four Songs (1903-5)
 Two Ballads (1907)
 Five Songs to texts by Richard Dehmel (1907)
 Sechs Gesänge after poems by Maurice Maeterlinck, Op. 13 (1910/13)
 Four Songs (1916)
 Und einmal gehst du (1933)
 Sechs Lieder, Op. 22 (1934; first performance, Prague 1934)
 Das bucklichte Männlein (1934)
 Ahnung Beatricens (1935)
 Zwölf Lieder, Op. 27 (1937)
 Three Songs (T: Irma Stein-Firner) (1939)

Orchestral works
 Symphony in E minor (1891) – two surviving movements only
 Symphony No. 1 in D minor (1892–93)
 Eine Lustspielouvertüre (1894–95)
 Symphony No. 2 in B-flat major (1897)
 Drei Ballettstücke. Suite from Der Triumph der Zeit (1902)
 Die Seejungfrau (The Mermaid), fantasy after Hans Christian Andersen's "The Little Mermaid" (1902–03, premiered in Vienna in 1905)
 Sinfonietta, Op. 23 (1934, first performance, Prague 1935)

Chamber music
 Three Pieces for cello and piano (1891)
 String Quartet in E minor (c.1893)
 Sonata in A minor for cello and piano (1894)
 Two Movements for string quintet (1894/1896) – surviving movements of the String Quintet in D minor
 Serenade (Suite) for violin and piano (1895)
 Trio for clarinet (or violin), cello and piano in D minor, Op. 3 (1896)
 String Quartet No. 1 in A major, Op. 4 (1896)
 String Quartet No. 2, Op. 15 (1913–15, first performance, Vienna 1918)
 String Quartet No. 3, Op. 19 (1924)
 Two Movements for string quartet (1927) – completed movements of abandoned quartet, originally intended as No.4
 String Quartet No. 4 (Suite), Op. 25 (1936)
 Quartet for clarinet, violin, viola and cello (1938/39) – unfinished, fragments only
 Humoreske (Rondo) for wind quintet (1939)
 Jagdstück (Hunting Piece) for two horns and piano (1939)

Works for piano
 Ländliche Tanze, Op. 1 (1892)
 Vier Balladen (1892–93)
 Albumblatt (Erinnerung aus Wien) (1895)
 Skizze (1896)
 Fantasien über Gedichte von Richard Dehmel, Op. 9 (1898)
 Menuett (from Das gläserne Herz) (1901)

Principal publishers: Universal Edition, Ricordi Berlin, Simrock/Boosey & Hawkes

See also
 Alexander von Zemlinsky.

Compositions by Alexander von Zemlinsky
Zemlinsky